Gina Adams (born 1965) is an American interdisciplinary artist and activist.

Family 
Gina Adams' parents were Philip F. Adams (1937–2002), born in Portsmouth, New Hampshire, and Elaine Rose Theriault Adams who lived in Kittery, Maine. Her family members operated the Kittery Trading Post in the town.

Adams has controversially claimed to be of White Earth Ojibwe and Lakota descent, despite providing no proof of these claims. She claimed that her paternal grandfather lived on the White Earth Indian Reservation and was removed at age eight to attend Carlisle Indian Industrial School, which closed in 1918. Genealogists reported that Adams' maternal grandfather "was a white man named Albert Theriault, who was born in Massachusetts to French-Canadian parents."

Adams has also claimed that her great-great-grandfather was Ojibwe chief Wabanquot (1830–1898). The enrollment director of the White Earth Band of the Minnesota Chippewa Tribe, Shahoon Heisler (White Earth Ojibwe) stated: "We don't have her, or her parent or grandparent, with any links to this tribe.... People are upset because she's been claiming she's a descendant. I can't find any documentation that would link her or her family to White Earth."

Education 
Gina Adams earned a BFA from the Maine College of Art and an MFA from the University of Kansas. According to her website, she studied visual art, curatorial practice, and critical theory.

Career 
Adams was a professor at Naropa University in Boulder, Colorado, in the visual arts faculty. 

She joined Emily Carr University in August of 2019 as Assistant Professor, Foundation.  Emily Carr hired Adams as part of a cluster hire of Indigenous professors. She resigned from Emily Carr on August 25, 2022.

Adams is known for her antique quilt artwork; however, her work spans a wide range of styles, including mediums such as sculpture, ceramics, painting, printmaking, and drawing.

Adams's work revolved around broken treaties between the U.S. and Native American tribes. Her artwork has been published in The New Yorker, Hyperallergic, and The Huffington Post.

Additional work 
Gina's work was also featured in the "March Madness" exhibit in the Meatpacking district of New York. Her work displayed vintage photographs of a girls' basketball team at Osage Boarding School; a school which attempted to assimilate Indigenous children by erasing their Native culture. This school denied children the right to speak their native language, and even denied the right to say their own name.

References

External links 
 Gina Adams, official website

Living people
1965 births
American textile artists
American people who self-identify as being of Native American descent
Artists from San Francisco
Maine College of Art alumni
University of Kansas alumni
Naropa University faculty